Impleta is a genus of flies belonging to the family Mycetophilidae.

The species of this genus are found in Europe and Northern America.

Species:
 Impleta consorta Plassmann, 1978 
 Impleta polypori (Vockeroth, 1980)

References

Mycetophilidae